Lana's sawshark (Pristiophorus lanae) or the Philippine sawshark, is a sawshark of the family Pristiophoridae, found in the Philippines off Apo Island and southern Luzon at depths of between 230 and 590 m.  Its length is up to 73 cm.

Max length : 66.9 cm TL male/unsexed, 83.0 cm TL (female)

Its reproduction is presumed to be ovoviviparous.

References

 Compagno, Dando, & Fowler, Sharks of the World, Princeton University Press, New Jersey 2005 

Lana's sawshark
Endemic fauna of the Philippines
Fish of the Philippines
Lana's sawshark